Výrov is a municipality and village in Plzeň-North District in the Plzeň Region of the Czech Republic. It has about 400 inhabitants.

Administrative parts
The village of Hadačka is an administrative part of Výrov.

Geography
It lies in the Plasy Uplands, in a mainly agricultural landscape.

References

Villages in Plzeň-North District